The Golden Lotus (Vietnamese: Bông sen vàng) is the highest prize awarded to competing films at the Vietnam Film Festival. The award is separated in different categories: feature film; direct-to-video; documentary film; science film and animated film. The Golden Lotus is awarded for one or several films which are chosen by the jury of each category as the best production of the festival. It is also possible that the prize is not awarded if the jury decides that no film at the festival deserves the Golden Lotus.

History
The first Vietnamese film festival was organized in order to encourage the work of composing and honor the outstanding works of Vietnamese artists in cinema field. Awards include Golden Lotus, Silver Lotus and Certificate of Merit. The Golden Lotus Medal was then designed with the image of a Golden lotus along with the name of the winning film carved in a circular shape of gilded metal, placed in a rectangular lacquer box lined with a purple-blue velvet fabric. From the jury to the award-winning artist, no one received any monetary remuneration as well as material gifts, only such symbolic medals.

From the first to the eighth festival, the Golden Lotus was awarded in three systems: feature films, documentary/science films and animated films.

From the sixth to the tenth festival, feature film for children was combined with animated film into children/animated film section, judging by the same jury.

Since the 9th film festival, the organizers have opened an additional entry for direct-to-video feature films. This section was later dropped starting at the 20th festival due to the outdated film format.

Starting from the 15th film festival, documentary film and scientific films were separated into two separate awarding systems, although still sharing the same jury.

Awards
The following films received the Golden Lotuses of the Vietnam Film Festival:

Multiple winners 
The following directors received the Golden Lotus for Best Feature Film more than one time:
Đặng Nhật Minh: 4 times
Trần Vũ: 3 times
Victor Vu: 3 times
Huy Thành: 2 times
Nguyễn Thanh Vân: 2 times

Notes

See also 
Golden Kite Awards, also known as the Vietnam Cinema Association Awards

References 

Vietnam Film Festival
Lists of films by award
Awards established in 1973
Vietnamese film awards